Goodleburg Cemetery is a cemetery located in  South Wales, New York.  It is an old, inactive village lot whose use has been discontinued.  Many of the original settlers of Wales and the surrounding areas are buried here.

History 
Goodleberg Cemetery was an active cemetery from 1811 until 1927. The cemetery stood relatively peacefully until the late 1990s, when stories spread about ghost stories and ghastly apparitions.  Various paranormal research organizations, intent on capturing the paranormal activities at Goodleberg paraded carloads of investigators from neighboring counties, intent on capturing evidence of the paranormal.

Folklore

In recent years, it has been a site of frequent desecration.

Paranormal author Mason Winfield has written about this cemetery and its purported activity several times, but has also expressed regret to writing anything about it due to the spike in vandalism since then.

Happenings 
There are many stories of what people have seen while in the cemetery.  Some of the myths include the "Lady in White".  The lady in white is supposedly one of the patients who passed on and still roams the area.  The Lady in White can be seen up the road and other areas surrounding the cemetery.  Another myth is that a normal seeming person in his 20s will appear. He will do whatever it takes to get you to leave the surrounding areas. He had been described as having curly hair and wearing camouflage. If touched, it is said that he will disappear instantly. This is the spirit of a young Albert Speaker trying to protect what is his. Two other common happening include the strong winds followed by the cry of a baby by the back pond and colored orbs appearing in pictures taken at night.

References

External links 
 Town of Wales Cemeteries

1811 establishments in New York (state)
Reportedly haunted locations in New York (state)
Cemeteries in Erie County, New York